The 2022–23 Nitro Rallycross Championship is the second season of Nitro Rallycross (Nitro RX) competition.

Series founder Travis Pastrana enters as the defending champion. The season saw the debut of the Group E class for the new FC1-X car.

Schedule
The full schedule was revealed on March 29, 2022. After exclusively competing in North America in 2021, the series expanded to include races in six countries across two calendar years for its second season. A round at the KymiRing in Finland was canceled due to the track's financial problems. On November 7, 2022, it was announced that the round at Wild Horse Pass would be a double header, while the round in Saudi Arabia was removed from the schedule on the series' website. On January 13, 2023, the series announced that the finale would be a double header, held again at Glen Helen Raceway in California. Due to snowmelt issues with the track in Calgary, the initially planned championship round was cancelled, and a non-championship round was held instead. The season finale at Glen Helen then became a triple header for the Group E class.

Drivers

Group E

Supercar Europe

NEXT Europe

NEXT North America

Crosscar

Driver standings

Group E

References

Nitro
Nitro
Nitro
2022 Nitro